Huoying Subdistrict is a subdistrict situated within Changping District, Beijing, China. It shares border with Dongxiaokou Town in the north and east, Xisanqi and Huilongguan Subdistricts in the south, and Longzeyuan Subdistrict in the west. According to the result of 2020 Chinese census, the subdistrict's population was 93,545.

This region was once called Huoshaoying Village during the Qing dynasty. As the amount of people with the surname Huo increased, it was later changed to Huoying.

History

Administrative divisions 

In 2021, the following 19 communities constituted Huoying Subdistrict:

See also 

 List of township-level divisions of Beijing

References 

Changping District
Subdistricts of Beijing